Freren is a municipality in the Emsland district, in Lower Saxony, Germany. It is situated approximately 15 km east of Lingen.

Freren is also the seat of the Samtgemeinde ("collective municipality") Freren.

{{Cities and towns in Emsland 
(district)}}

Emilie Bundan is a famous resident of Freren.

References

Emsland